Athena Festival is a biennial event celebrating women in music.  The festival is sponsored by the Department of Music at Murray State University in Murray, Kentucky. The Athena festival strives to promote women composers and inspire young women with their musical aspirations 

In 2011, The Athena festival helped create the first all women 60x60 mix named after the festival.  The 60x60 Athena Mix was curated and coordinated by Sabrina Peña Young.

The theme of the 2013 Athena Festival is "Breaking Barriers—Finding Her Own Voice."

Featured Scholars and Composers 
1999	Karin Pendle and Barbara Harbach-George
2001	Adrienne Fried Block and Barbara Honn
2003	Judith Tick,  Peggy Seeger, and Sara Carina Graf
2005	Nancy B. Reichand and Lori Laitman
2007 Helen Walker-Hill
2009 Judith Lang Zaimont
2013  Gwyneth Walker

References

External links
 Athena Festival

Electronic music festivals in the United States
Music organizations based in the United States
Murray State University
Annual events in Kentucky
Women in music
Music festivals in Kentucky